St Ann may  refer to:
Saint Ann or Saint Anne, the mother of the Virgin Mary
St. Ann, Missouri, United States
Saint Ann Parish, Jamaica
 Saint Ann's Bay, Jamaica, capital of Saint Anne Parish
St Ann Without, East Sussex

See also
Church of St. Ann (disambiguation)
Saint Anne (disambiguation)
St Ann's (disambiguation)
St Anne's (disambiguation)
Sainte-Anne (disambiguation)
Santa Ana (disambiguation)
Anna (disambiguation)
Fort Sainte Anne (disambiguation)